Bornella irvingi is a species of sea slug, a nudibranch, a shell-less marine gastropod mollusc in the family Bornellidae.

Distribution 
This species was described from the Pitcairn Islands, Pacific Ocean.

Description
Bornella irvingi has a smooth white body, white gills and lateral appendages. The velar tentacles, rhinophore clubs and rhinophore sheath processes are orange, with white bases. There is a dark brown area on the head separating these processes from the rest of the body.

References

Bornellidae
Gastropods described in 1996